Youth suicide is when a young person, generally categorized as someone below the legal age of majority, deliberately ends their own life. Rates of youth suicide and attempted youth suicide in Western societies and other countries are high. Youth suicide attempts are more common among girls, but adolescent males are the ones who usually carry out suicide. Suicide rates in youths have nearly tripled between the 1960s and 1980s. For example, in Australia suicide is second only to motor vehicle accidents as its leading cause of death for people aged 15–25, and according to the National Institute for Mental Health, suicide is the third leading cause of death among teens in the United States.

Suicide contagion
According to research conducted by the Commission for Children and Young People and Child Guardian in 2007, 39% of all youth suicides are completed by young people who have lost someone of influence / significance to them to suicide. The Commission terms this suicide contagion and makes several recommendations as to the importance of safeguarding young people and communities from suicide contagion

In 2011 the Australian Federal Parliament Standing Committee for Health and Ageing Inquiry into Youth Suicide met in a round table forum with young representatives from three organizations at the forefront of preventing youth suicide. These organizations included Sunnykids, Inspire, and Boys Town. The Standing Committee has since released a discussion paper highlighting the findings of their inquiry and will seek to make final recommendations on the most effective means for reducing youth suicide.

Teens at risk
One of the problems facing teenagers at risk of suicide is getting psychiatric counselling when it is needed. One research at the beginning of 2020 shows that Compared with older adolescents, younger adolescents particularly agree that increased cyberbullying and  despair are very important factors influencing suicide among adolescents. One study says, "In teenagers, depression is considered a major – if not the leading – cause of teen suicide." Factors and risks contributed to youth suicide are academic pressure, alcohol consumption, the loss of a valued relationship, frequent change of residency, and poor family patterns. Harassment is a leading cause of teen suicide, along with abuse. Gay teens or those unsure of their sexual identity are more likely to die by suicide, particularly if they have suffered bullying or harassment, as discussed next. The following campaigns have been started in hopes of giving teens hope and abolishing the feeling of isolation.
 It Gets Better
 Born This Way
 I Get Bullied Too
 Stop Youth Suicide
Lack of impulse control has been found to differentiate adolescent suicide attempters from a control group of adolescents with an acute illness (Slap, Vorters, Chaudhuri, & Centor, 1988). However, impulsivity does not characterize all suicide attempters, since group comparisons have found no differences between suicidal patients and psychiatric controls on a measure of cognitive impulsivity (Patsiokas, Clum, & Luscomb, 1979). Instead, impulsivity may be important in identifying high-risk subgroups.

Sexual minority youth and suicide 
Youth that fall under the category of sexual minorities are at an elevated risk of depression and succumbing to self-harm. Among the population of sexual minority youth, on average, 28% explain having past experiences with suicidal actions and/or thoughts. Lesbian and gay youth are the group most likely to face negative experiences, leading to a higher likelihood of the development of suicidal thoughts according to mental care professionals. Bisexuality also carries a higher likelihood of suicidality with bisexuals being five times more likely to report suicidal thoughts and actions. Sexual minority youth also report a higher incidence of substance abuse when compared to heterosexuals. Overall, studies suggest that sexual minority youth carry a higher incidence of suicide and depression, and that reforms centered on alleviating minority stigma attenuate this disparity.

Previous exposure, attempts, and age impacting youth suicide 
Exposure to suicide, previous attempts of suicide, and age are some of the most influential factors of young individuals and their probability of dying by suicide. Adolescent exposure to suicide through classmates has caused researchers to hypothesize suicide as a contagion. They note how a child's exposure to suicide predicts suicide ideation and attempts. Previous exposure to suicide through parental attempts have also been found to have a 3.5 increase in a youth's probability of having suicidal thoughts, with a 2.6 increased chance of them attempting suicide. Aggression in families and its transference can be one of the main causes of transmission of suicidal tendencies in families.

Previous attempts of suicide also play a major role in a youth attempting suicide again. On average, it has been recorded that the follow-up period for suicide-attempters was 3.88 years. Evidence shows those most at risk for suicide are those who previously attempted suicide, with research showing that they can have anywhere from a 40 to over a 100 times higher chance of dying by suicide compared to the general population.

Age and experience also factor in suicide. It has been found that older, more experienced populations take more time to plan, choose deadlier methods, and have greater suicidal intent. This results in them eventually committing suicide at a higher rate than their younger counterparts.

Bereavement among young people
The primary goals of suicide postvention include assisting the survivors of suicide with the grief process, along with identifying and referring those survivors who may be at risk for negative outcomes such as depressive and anxiety disorders, and suicidal behaviour. With 42% of youth suicides being suicide bereavement (or contagion) related – further research and investment must be made into supporting this group of people. A few suggestions to make sure the support is effective include making the individuals feel connected and understood.

Epidemiology 
Two possible determinants to suicide attempts are lifetime sexual abuse and adult physical violence. Among participants aged 18–25, the odds ratios for lifetime sexual abuse and adult physical violence are 4.27 and 3.85, respectively. In other words, those who died by suicide are 327% more likely to have experienced lifetime sexual assault. Similarly, a suicide victim is 285% more likely to have suffered physical violence as an adult. Based on a survey done on American high school students, 16% reported considering suicide and 8% reported attempting suicide sometime within the 12 months before taking the survey. Between 1980 and 1994, the suicide rates of young black males doubled. American Indians and Alaska Natives die by suicide at a higher rate than any other ethnic group in the United States. In India, one-third of suicides are young people 15–29. In 2002, 154,000 suicides were recorded in India. In the United States, about 60 percent of suicides are carried out with a gun. Some Aboriginal teens and gay or lesbian teens are at high risk, depending on their community and their own self-esteem. Several campaigns have been started to give them hope and help them to feel less isolated.

The 2019 Youth Risk Behavior Survey, which was conducted by the CDC, found that between 2009-2018, suicide rates among adolescents aged 14-18 years increased by 61.7%. Furthermore, the CDC reported that in 2019, among American adolescents in grades 9 to12: 

 18.8% of students reported seriously considering attempting suicide
 15.7% of students made a suicide plan 
 8.9% of students attempted suicide

Intervention
One organization in Australia has found that young people who feel connected, supported, and understood are less likely to die by suicide. Reports on the attitudes of young people identified as at risk of suicide have been released. Such reports support the notion that connectedness, a sense of being supported and respected, is a protective factor for young people at risk of suicide. According to Pueblo Suicide Prevention Center (PSPC) for some reason kids today are experiencing more pressure.

For immediate help, contact SAMHSA's National Suicide Prevention Lifeline at 1-800-273-TALK (8255).

Issues for communities
Intervention issues for communities to address include suicide contagion, developmental understanding of suicide, development and suicide risk, and the influence of culture. Key matters in postvention responses for young people include: community context, life stage relevance of responses, identification, and referral (Postvention Co-ordination), developing a suite of services, and creating ongoing options.

Prevention 

One can help prevent adolescent suicide by discouraging isolation, addressing a child's depression which is correlated with suicide, getting rid of any objects that a child could use to attempt suicide, and simply paying attention to what the child does or feels.

Schools are a great place to provide more education and support for suicide prevention. Since students spend the majority of their time at school, the school can be either a haven from or a source of suicidal triggers, and students' peers can heavily influence their state of mind. The school setting is an ideal environment to educate students on suicide and have support readily available.

Suicide Prevention Resource Center provides professional information and resources on suicide prevention.

Prevention resources for parents, guardians, social workers, teachers, school staff, peers:

 Sibshops
 Youth Mental Health First Aid 
 More can be found on U.S. Department of Health & Human Services website for Mental Health in Adolescent

National Suicide Prevention Lifeline for Youth provides resources and information for teens and adolescents such as:

 The Trevor Project
 You Matter
 StopBullying.gov
 Love is Respect
Ditch the Label

Table of youth suicide rates (per 100,000) 

Information taken from World Psychiatry, the official journal of the World Psychiatric Association. Numbers are per 100,000.

See also
Suicide among LGBT youth
Depression in childhood and adolescence
List of suicides that have been attributed to bullying

References

External links
 Your Life Counts!, Canada
 Suicide Prevention Lifeline, U.S.
 The It Gets Better Project created by Dan Savage
 Reducing Youth Suicide in Queensland
 Report on early intervention programs aimed at preventing youth suicide Australia